Amreshwar Pratap Sahi (born 1 January 1959) is an Indian Judge. He is former Chief Justice of Madras High Court, and Patna High Court and Judge of Allahabad High Court.

Career
Sahi graduated in law in year 1985, and enrolled as an advocate of the Allahabad high court on September 6, 1985, where he practiced civil and constitutional matters. He became an additional judge of the Allahabad high court on September 24, 2004 and was confirmed as permanent judge on August 18, 2005.

On 23 October, he was appointed senior most judge of Allahabad High Court. On 10 November 2018, he was appointed chief justice of Patna High Court, and was sworn in on 17 November 2018.

On 11 November 2019, he took oath as chief justice of Madras High Court. He retired on 31 December 2020.

References 

1959 births
Living people
Chief Justices of the Patna High Court
Judges of the Allahabad High Court
21st-century Indian judges